Nikola Radojičić (born September 11, 1986) is a Serbian professional basketball player who last played for Dzukija Alytus of the Lietuvos krepšinio lyga.

On August 14, 2014, has been arrested in Peru because Radojičić swallowed 23 capsules containing 10 grams of cocaine in his stomach.

References

1986 births
Living people
Basketball League of Serbia players
KK MZT Skopje players
OKK Beograd players
Serbian men's basketball players
Sluneta Ústí nad Labem players
Serbian expatriate basketball people in Cyprus
Serbian expatriate basketball people in the Czech Republic
Serbian expatriate basketball people in Georgia (country)
Serbian expatriate basketball people in Lithuania
Serbian expatriate basketball people in Slovenia
Serbian expatriate basketball people in Syria
Serbian expatriate basketball people in Romania
Serbian expatriate basketball people in North Macedonia
Guards (basketball)
Helios Suns players